Heidi Britton Harley (born September 26, 1969) is a Professor of Linguistics at the University of Arizona. Her areas of specialization are formal syntactic theory, morphology, and lexical semantics.

Career
Harley was born in Oregon, but was raised in St. John's, Newfoundland. She earned her B.A. in Linguistics and English at Memorial University of Newfoundland in 1991. She received her Ph.D. in Linguistics and Philosophy in 1995 from Massachusetts Institute of Technology, under the supervision of Alec Marantz.

Harley is one of the main researchers working in the theory of Distributed morphology. She has published over thirty articles on morphological theory, syntax, and semantics, including articles in the journals Language, Linguistic Inquiry, Lingua, Morphology Yearbook, and Studia Linguistica. She is the editor of three volumes of collected papers, the editor of two special issues of journals, and is the author of a textbook on morphological theory (Harley 2005).

Honors 
The Linguistic Society of America has named Harley as one of the 2019 LSA Fellows, a group whose membership is determined by their "distinguished contributions to the discipline."

She taught at the 2015 Linguistic Summer Institute organized gy the LSA. She has been an invited teacher at other major summer schools in linguistics throughout the world including Ireland and Brazil.

Specializations
Syntax
Distributed Morphology
Argument Structure
Lexical semantics

Selected publications
 Heidi Harley. 1995. Subjects, Events and Licensing. PhD Dissertation, MIT.
 Heidi Harley and Rolf Noyer. 1999. Distributed morphology. Glot International, Volume 4, Issue 4, April 1999.
 Andrew Carnie, Heidi Harley, and MaryAnn Willie, eds. 2003. Formal Approaches to Function: In honor of Eloise Jelinek, John Benjamins Publishers. ISBN 9781588113481
 Andrew Carnie, Sheila Dooley, and Heidi Harley. 2005. Verb First: On the Syntax of Verb Initial Languages, John Benjamins. ISBN 9781588116109
 Heidi Harley. 2005. English Words. Blackwell Publishers.  ISBN 978-0631230328
 Daniel Siddiqi and Heidi Harley, eds. 2016. Morphological Metatheory. Amsterdam: Benjamins.

References

External links
 Harley's website
 
 

1969 births
Living people
Morphologists
Syntacticians
Linguists from the United States
MIT School of Humanities, Arts, and Social Sciences alumni
University of Arizona faculty
Women linguists
Fellows of the Linguistic Society of America